Robert Henry Gordon (1917 – 18 September 1940) was a professional footballer, who played for Huddersfield Town.

He also made a solitary 'guest' appearance for Mossley in the 1939–40 season.

He died in September 1940 of pulmonary tuberculosis at RAF Hospital Ely in World War II whilst serving as a Leading Aircraftman of the Royal Air Force Volunteer Reserve in No 9 Sqn, RAF.

References

1917 births
1940 deaths
English footballers
Footballers from Northumberland
Association football defenders
English Football League players
Huddersfield Town A.F.C. players
Royal Air Force personnel killed in World War II
Mossley A.F.C. players
Royal Air Force Volunteer Reserve personnel of World War II
Royal Air Force airmen
20th-century deaths from tuberculosis
Tuberculosis deaths in England
Military personnel from Northumberland